Abdulmajid Anad (Arabic:عبد المجيد عناد) (born 7 January 1994) is a Qatari footballer. He currently plays for  Al-Kharaitiyat .

External links
 

Qatari footballers
1994 births
Living people
Al-Rayyan SC players
Al-Gharafa SC players
Al Kharaitiyat SC players
Qatar Stars League players
Qatari Second Division players
Association football midfielders